Crash Donovan is a 1936 American drama film directed by William Nigh and Jean Negulesco and starring Jack Holt, John 'Dusty' King and Nan Grey. It marked the directorial debut of the Romanian-born Negulesco.

Partial cast
 Jack Holt as 'Crash' Donovan  
 John 'Dusty' King as Johnny Allen  
 Nan Grey as Doris Tennyson  
 Eddie Acuff as Alabam  
 Hugh Buckler as Captain Tennyson  
 Ward Bond as The Drill Master  
 James Donlan as Smokey  
 Douglas Fowley as Harris  
 William Tannen as Tony  
 Huey White as Fizz  
 Al Hill as Mike  
 Gardner James as Pete  
 Paul Porcasi as Cafe Owner

References

Bibliography
 Michael Schlossheimer. Gunmen and Gangsters: Profiles of Nine Actors Who Portrayed Memorable Screen Tough Guys. McFarland, 2001.

External links

1936 films
American drama films
1936 drama films
1930s English-language films
Films directed by Jean Negulesco
Films directed by William Nigh
Universal Pictures films
American black-and-white films
1936 directorial debut films
1930s American films